Başmakçı is a town and district of Afyonkarahisar Province, Turkey.

Başmakçı may also refer to:

Başmakçı, Burdur
Başmakçı, Çorum, Turkey
Başmakçı, Niğde, Turkey